Kathleen Comley is a British Paralympic archer.

She competed at the 1960 Summer Paralympics where she won a silver medal in the Women's FITA round open event and a bronze medal in the Women's Windsor round open event.

References

Year of birth missing (living people)
Living people
Paralympic archers of Great Britain
Paralympic silver medalists for Great Britain
Paralympic bronze medalists for Great Britain
Medalists at the 1960 Summer Paralympics
Archers at the 1960 Summer Paralympics
Paralympic medalists in archery